Sophon may refer to:

Sophon, a fictional elementary particle created by unfolding a proton into 2 dimensions and engraving it with circuitry, in the novel The Three-Body Problem
(Spoiler) Sophon, the fictional character embodying the aforenamed technology in the sequel novel Death's End
Sophon (name), people with the name Sophon

See also
 Sophos